Love Has to Be Learned (German: Liebe will gelernt sein) is a 1963 West German comedy film directed by Kurt Hoffmann and starring Martin Held, Barbara Rütting and  Götz George. It was adapted by Erich Kästner from his own play.

It was shot at the Spandau Studios in Berlin and on location around Munich in Bavaria. The film's sets were designed by the art directors Hans Jürgen Kiebach and Ernst Schomer.

Cast
 Martin Held as Christoph Mylius
 Barbara Rütting as Hermine
 Götz George as Hansgeorg Lehmbruck
 Loni von Friedl as Margot
 Fita Benkhoff as Ilse Lehmbruck
 Grit Boettcher as Dora
 Margarete Haagen as Frau Krüger
 Bruno Hübner as Feldhammer
 Charles Regnier as Regisseur Kramer
 Herta Staal as Nelly
 Ralf Wolter as Regie-Assistent Müller
 Blandine Ebinger as Fräulein Lydia Bretschneider
 Michael Barry as Andreas
 Dagmar Hank as Studentin
 Peter Striebeck as Student Melzer

References

Bibliography 
 Bock, Hans-Michael & Bergfelder, Tim. The Concise CineGraph. Encyclopedia of German Cinema. Berghahn Books, 2009.

External links 
 

1963 films
West German films
German comedy films
1963 comedy films
1960s German-language films
Films directed by Kurt Hoffmann
Constantin Film films
Films shot at Spandau Studios
German films based on plays
Films set in Munich
Films shot in Munich
Films based on works by Erich Kästner
1960s German films